Gravity Studios is a recording studio in Chicago, Illinois founded in 1993 by Doug McBride. Starting with the single "Seether" by local band Veruca Salt, Gravity has hosted bands such as the Plain White T's, Silversun Pickups, and Fall Out Boy. 

An adjacent mastering studio, Gravity Mastering, has been used by bands and producers throughout United States.

History
Gravity Studios was founded by music producer/engineer Doug McBride in 1993, in Wicker Park neighborhood of Chicago, Illinois. McBride left his job at Chicago Recording Company to manage the new recording studio, and picked Wicker Park because it was a cheap area to afford practice space, and also its central position in the local alt rock scene. He has stated, "[Wicker Park] was primarily composed of a bunch of starving musicians hanging out, going to each other’s shows, and influencing each other musically."

The first band McBride encountered after finishing construction was Veruca Salt, who he met through friends before they’d played their first show. He recommended they record their single "Seether" at Gravity, and the song went on to become popular at Chicago's Q101, and propelled the band to a deal with Geffen.

Local bands such as Verbow, Dovetail Joint and Jamie Blake soon started coming to Gravity for production and recording. The Smashing Pumpkins spent two weeks with McBride, which contributed to the creation of their album Pisces Iscariot. Through the late 1990s the studio began booking major label clients, producing recordings such as Rachael Yamagata’s "Collide", Fall Out Boy, Rise Against, and Badly Drawn Boy. McBride has stated, "I suppose Gravity found a niche as the place to go to get a big, warm, organic sound."

In 2000 Gravity began construction on an adjacent B studio, which was offered at a lower price, allowing bands with smaller budgets to record. Some of the engineers and producers who have worked at Gravity include John Agnello, Mitch Easter, Jim O’Rourke, Peter Mokran, Mike Clink, Bob Mould, Brad Wood, and Bill Stevenson.

On August 14, 2006 Silversun Pickups recorded new material at Gravity, which was released as The Tripwire sessions: Live in Chicago. Recent clients include Filligar, Anna Fermin, and Lee De Wyze.

As of August 2013, services include, but are not limited to, producing, tracking, mixing, mastering, forensic audio, noise reduction, drum editing and sample replacement, vocal tuning, re-amping, rock band programming, and mix consultation. McBride also teaches recording for Tribeca Flashpoint Media Arts Academy.

Gear
By the late 1990s Gravity had a vintage 1976 Neve 8058 console, which McBride says was the only one in Chicago. The console had spent the late '70s at Automated Sound in New York, recording albums such as Steely Dan's Aja. In October 2008 it was announced the studio had installed a Rupert Neve Designs 5088 Console. As of July 2009 the studio uses Pro Tools, often in conjunction with analog gear.

As of September 2013, instruments include a five piece DW Drum Kit, a Fender Jazz Bass, a Fender Telecaster, and a Gold Tone Paul Beard Signature Dobro. Recorders include Pro Tools 10 HD Native, a Tascam 122 MKIII Cassette Deck, and a Sony PCM-2600 DAT. Outboard Gear includes a Shadow Hills Dual Vandergraph and a Shadow Hills Mono Optograph.

Mastering
In 2005 McBride opened a second studio, Gravity Mastering, adjacent in the same building. Among Gravity Mastering's first clients were Augustana, Building Rome, Filligar, Mirror Mirror, Showoff, Jim Peterik, and The Days.

Artists
Artists that have worked at Gravity Studios include: Veruca Salt, The Smashing Pumpkins, Atari Teenage riot, Rod Stewart, Fall Out Boy, Hawthorne Heights, Silversun Pickups, The Walkmen, Rachael Yamagata, Umphrey's McGee, Tub Ring, Motion City Soundtrack, Kasabian, Dashboard Confessional, Ben Kweller, Less Than Jake, Rise Against, Buddy Guy, Live, Verbow, As Tall As Lions, Augustana, Badly Drawn Boy, Company of Thieves, Enuff Z'Nuff, Filligar, Kill Hannah, Lucky Boys Confusion, Urge Overkill, Skillet, Spitalfield, You vs Yesterday, Shea Couleé, Brad Peterson and Story of the Year.

Staff
Doug McBride: Founder, Producer, Chief Engineer
Ramsey Valentyn: Manager, Producer, Songwriter
Daniel Farnsworth: Engineer, Producer
Grey Taxon: Engineer, Producer, Songwriter
Ben Harris: Engineer, Producer, Songwriter
Daniel Patt: Engineer, Producer, Songwriter

Discography

References

External links
Gravity Studios
Gravity Mastering

Companies based in Chicago
Recording studios in the United States